Manik Hossain Molla, simply known as Manik Molla, is a Bangladeshi professional footballer who plays as a midfielder for Bangladesh Premier League club Mohammedan SC and the Bangladesh national team. He started his senior professional career playing for Fakirerpool in the Bangladesh Championship League.

Career statistics

International

References

External links 
 
 

Living people
1999 births
Bangladeshi footballers
People from Rajshahi District
Association football defenders
Bangladesh international footballers
Arambagh KS players
Abahani Limited (Chittagong) players
Sheikh Russel KC players
Mohammedan SC (Dhaka) players
Bangladesh Football Premier League players